Balta may refer to:

People
 Balta (footballer) (born 1962), Spanish footballer and manager
 Balta (surname)

Places
Balta (crater), on Mars

Balta, Mehedinți, Romania
Bâlta, a village in Filiași, Dolj County, Romania
Bâlta, a village in Runcu, Gorj, Romania
Balta, Russia, the name of several rural localities in Russia
Balta, Ukraine, Ukraine
Balta, Shetland, an island in Scotland
Balta Sound on the island of Unst in the Shetland Islands, Scotland
Balta, a small town and its delegation Balta Bou-Alouane in Tunisia 
Balta, North Dakota, US

Rivers
Bâlta (river), a tributary of the Bistrița in Gorj County, Romania
Balta (Târnava Mică), a tributary of the Târnava Mică in Sibiu and Alba Counties, Romania
Balta (Topolnița), a tributary of the Topolnița in Mehedinți County, Romania

Other
 Balta (cockroach), a genus of cockroach

See also
 Balta Albă (disambiguation)
 Balta Verde (disambiguation)
 
 Balti (disambiguation)